Scott County is the name of eleven counties in the United States of America:

Scott County, Arkansas
Scott County, Illinois
Scott County, Indiana
Scott County, Iowa, the most populous county on the list
Scott County, Kansas, the least populous county on the list
Scott County, Kentucky
Scott County, Minnesota
Scott County, Mississippi
Scott County, Missouri
Scott County, Tennessee
Scott County, Virginia